David Courtney Westenhaver (January 13, 1865 – July 29, 1928) was a United States district judge of the United States District Court for the Northern District of Ohio.

Education and career

Born in Berkeley County, West Virginia, Westenhaver received a Bachelor of Laws from Georgetown Law in 1886. He was in private practice in Martinsburg, West Virginia from 1886 to 1903, serving as a prosecuting attorney of Berkeley County from 1886 to 1887, and as a member of the Martinsburg City Council from 1902 to 1903. He then moved his practice to Cleveland, Ohio from 1903 to 1917, and was a member of the Board of Education of Cleveland from 1912 to 1915.

Federal judicial service

Westenhaver was nominated by President Woodrow Wilson on March 12, 1917, to a seat on the United States District Court for the Northern District of Ohio vacated by Judge John Hessin Clarke. He was confirmed by the United States Senate on March 14, 1917, and received his commission the same day. His service terminated on July 29, 1928, due to his death.

Notable Cases

Westenhaver was the presiding judge in the sedition trial of Eugene V. Debs in 1918, and handed down the widely protested sentence of ten years imprisonment that was ultimately commuted by President Warren Harding.

In 1926, Westenhaver ruled in favor of the business interest of his former partner Newton Baker in Euclid v. Ohio, a decision that was overturned by the United States Supreme Court in a landmark ruling that established the constitutionality of zoning laws.

Family

Westenhaver was married June 1888, at Martinsburg to Mary C. Paull. They had one son.
He was a Democrat in politics.

References

Sources

Further reading

 Alfred Wagenknecht (ed.), Guilty? Of What? : Speeches Before the Jury in Connection with the Trial of C.E. Ruthenberg, Alfred Wagenknecht, Charles Baker.(Cleveland, OH: [Socialist Party of Ohio], [August 1917]).

1865 births
1928 deaths
County prosecuting attorneys in West Virginia
Georgetown University Law Center alumni
Judges of the United States District Court for the Northern District of Ohio
Ohio Democrats
Ohio lawyers
Politicians from Martinsburg, West Virginia
Lawyers from Cleveland
School board members in Ohio
United States district court judges appointed by Woodrow Wilson
20th-century American judges
West Virginia city council members
West Virginia Democrats
Lawyers from Martinsburg, West Virginia